Stephanie Kulp Seymour (born October 16, 1940) is a senior United States circuit judge of the United States Court of Appeals for the Tenth Circuit. She was the first female federal court judge in Oklahoma.

Background and Career

Seymour was born in Battle Creek, Michigan in 1940, the second oldest of four children. Seymour and her family traveled extensively when she was young, visiting all but three states by car by the time she went to college. Though neither of her parents had a college education, they strongly influenced Seymour to obtain the highest level of education possible. Seymour received a Bachelor of Arts degree from Smith College in 1962, graduating Phi Beta Kappa and magna cum laude, and her Juris Doctor from Harvard Law School in 1965. At Harvard Law School, she was one of 23 women in a class of 550.

Seymour was in private practice in Boston, Massachusetts from 1965 to 1966, in Tulsa, Oklahoma from 1966 to 1967, in Houston, Texas from 1968 to 1969, and in Tulsa again from 1971 to 1979. In Houston, she was the first woman hired by Baker Botts.

Federal judicial service

Seymour was nominated by President Jimmy Carter on August 28, 1979, to the United States Court of Appeals for the Tenth Circuit, to a new seat created by 92 Stat. 1629. She was confirmed by the United States Senate on October 31, 1979, and received her commission on November 2, 1979. She served as Chief Judge from 1994 to 2000. She assumed senior status on October 16, 2005.

See also
List of United States federal judges by longevity of service

References

External links
 
 Voices of Oklahoma interview. First person interview conducted on September 5, 2019, with Stephanie Kulp Seymour.
 Oral History Interview with Stephanie Kulp Seymour

1940 births
Living people
20th-century American judges
21st-century American judges
American women lawyers
Harvard Law School alumni
Judges of the United States Court of Appeals for the Tenth Circuit
Massachusetts lawyers
Oklahoma lawyers
People from Battle Creek, Michigan
Smith College alumni
Texas lawyers
United States court of appeals judges appointed by Jimmy Carter
20th-century American women judges
21st-century American women judges
People associated with Baker Botts